Eslam Qaleh (also Romanized as Eslām Qal’eh; also known as Kāfar Qal‘eh and Kāfir Qal‘eh) is a village in Piveh Zhan Rural District, Ahmadabad District, Mashhad County, Razavi Khorasan Province, Iran. At the 2006 census, its population was 453, in 131 families.

References 

Populated places in Mashhad County